James Johnson (16 September 1908 – 31 January 1995) was a British Labour Party politician and Member of Parliament (MP).

He was born to the family of a Northumberland miner and was educated at Duke's School, Alnwick, and Leeds University. He played football for the English Universities XI and the Corinthians. Johnson was a lecturer in social studies at Coventry Technical College and an official for the National Union of General and Municipal Workers in Kenya. He served as a councillor on Coventry City Council.

Johnson was first elected to the House of Commons at the 1950 general election, as MP for Rugby. He was re-elected at the 1951 and 1955 elections, but at the 1959 general election, he lost his seat to the Conservative Party
candidate Roy Wise by a margin of only 470 votes.

He returned to Parliament five years later, at the 1964 general election, when he succeeded Mark Hewitson in the safe Labour seat of Kingston upon Hull West. He retired at the 1983 general election, when his seat was held for Labour by Stuart Randall.

Johnson never reached ministerial office, but he served as a parliamentary private secretary from 1964 to 66.

References

Times Guide to the House of Commons 1979

External links 
 

1908 births
1995 deaths
Alumni of the University of Leeds
GMB (trade union)-sponsored MPs
Labour Party (UK) MPs for English constituencies
Members of the Fabian Society
Corinthian F.C. players
British trade unionists
UK MPs 1950–1951
UK MPs 1951–1955
UK MPs 1955–1959
UK MPs 1964–1966
UK MPs 1966–1970
UK MPs 1970–1974
UK MPs 1974
UK MPs 1974–1979
UK MPs 1979–1983
Coventry City Councillors
Association footballers not categorized by position
English footballers